Paul Gordon Barker (born February 8, 1959), also referred to as Hermes Pan, is the former bass guitarist, producer and engineer of the industrial metal band Ministry from 1986 to 2003. Prior to Ministry, Barker provided bass for the Seattle post-punk ensemble The Blackouts alongside future Ministry drummer Bill Rieflin and his brother, one-time Ministry touring keyboardist/saxophonist Roland Barker, from 1979 until 1985.

Ministry
Beginning as touring bassist for Ministry's 1986 Twitch tour, Barker collaborated with frontman Al Jourgensen and collectively released The Land of Rape and Honey in 1988. Although many musicians briefly contributed to Ministry in the nearly two-decade period after Barker joined the band, he and Jourgensen were the only continuous members. The dynamics between these two different personalities came to shape Ministry's sound, along with a number of side-projects which they were involved in together.

In 2003, Barker left the band a year after the release of their eighth album Animositisomina. The decision was made official after the death of his father. Despite being in Ministry for almost 18 years, Jourgensen did not do anything to spur his departure. "Over the years we've had strained relations as well as good times, and the last tour was no different than any other tour. That means it was extremely difficult and very intense and lots of fun," Barker had said.

It is often believed that Jourgensen and Barker were close bandmates and the latter played a huge creative role in the band. Jourgensen rebuffed these claims saying that their relationship was more like an arranged marriage and "acrimonious." He said that they were never friends but business partners. Since leaving Ministry, Barker has distanced himself from Jourgensen and the two have had almost nothing positive to say about their relationship in the band.

Barker was quoted in a 2011 interview that it was "tough to watch" the band's Fix: The Ministry Movie documentary as he could no longer associate himself with the band. When asked in a 2015 interview if he would ever work with Jourgensen again, he replied, "I'm fairly confident we will not work together. We have zero relationship now." When asked why he left Ministry, he replied he was no longer willing to put up with the stupidity and decided that it was enough.

Barker has since moved on to other things and in 2016, seems to have more or less made peace with Ministry. "Of course, that was a very intense time and extremely rewarding. That was quite a while ago and I rarely think about it. I'm still fascinated with the heaviest, ugliest music and it's now hard to find the time for those pursuits. I am not in direct contact with Al these days."

In 2018, Jourgensen got back in touch with Barker. He contacted Barker while they both made appearances at screenings for the documentary Industrial Accident: The Story of Wax Trax! Records. Jourgensen has stated he is eager to collaborate with Barker very soon.

Post-Ministry
Since 2003, Barker has spent his time recording new material, producing such acts as I Love You But I've Chosen Darkness and collaborating with artists such as Stayte (on their 2007 Cognitive Dissonance (The Art of Lying To Yourself) EP). He joined U.S.S.A. with Duane Denison (Tomahawk, ex-The Jesus Lizard) as bassist. The first album from his solo project Flowering Blight, entitled The Perfect Pair, was released on November 19, 2008 via the official website.

In 2011, Barker remixed the Deadly Apples song Self Inflicted Oppression with samples from Ministry's Psalm 69. The remix was featured on the soundtrack for the documentary film Fix: The Ministry Movie.

Barker released Fix This!!! on April 10, 2012.  This album features guests such as Chris Connelly, Ogre, Taylor Momsen, Puscifer, Deadly Apples, Alexis S.F. Marshall, Joshua Bradford, and Devix Szell.

In 2015, Barker joined the touring lineup of rock supergroup Puscifer as their bassist.

Barker is also one of the founders of Malekko Heavy Industry Corporation, a manufacturer of synthesizer modules and guitar effect pedals.

Bands
The Blackouts (1979–1985)
Ministry (1986–2003)
Pailhead (1987–1988)
Revolting Cocks (1987–1993, 2016–present)
Lard (1988–2000)
Lead into Gold (1988–1990, 2015, 2017–present)
1000 Homo DJs (1988, 1990)
Acid Horse (1989)
PTP (1989)
Pigface (1990)
Pink Anvil (2001, 2003)
U.S.S.A. (2006–present)
Flowering Blight (2008)
Bells into Machines (2013–present)
Puscifer (2015–present, tour)

Footnotes

External links
Paul Ion Barker official website

1959 births
20th-century American bass guitarists
21st-century American bass guitarists
21st-century American guitarists
Alternative metal bass guitarists
American audio engineers
American heavy metal bass guitarists
American industrial musicians
American male bass guitarists
American rock bass guitarists
Record producers from California
Living people
Ministry (band) members
Musicians from the San Francisco Bay Area
Musicians from Palo Alto, California
Pigface members
Guitarists from California
Lard (band) members
Industrial metal musicians
Puscifer members